The Beaver and Erie Canal, also known as the Erie Extension Canal, was part of the Pennsylvania Canal system and consisted of three sections: the Beaver Division, the Shenango Division, and the Conneaut Division.

History
Construction of the canal was meant to complete a transport network through northwestern Pennsylvania that would connect Lake Erie with the Ohio River; the Main Line of Public Works, a canal which joined Philadelphia to Pittsburgh; and the Erie Canal, which connected Albany, New York, to Lake Erie.

The Beaver Division, begun in 1831, extended  from Beaver along the Beaver River and the Shenango River to Pulaski. Taking over the Conneaut Division from the state in 1843, the Erie Canal Company finished construction in 1844, when the entire length of the three divisions became open to traffic.

Two east–west canals connected to the Beaver and Erie. Another east–west canal, the French Creek Feeder, brought additional water into Conneaut Lake at the same time it provided a transportation corridor. It ran  from near Meadville, where it connected with the Franklin Line canal of  running along French Creek to Franklin. At its southern terminus near Beaver, the Beaver and Erie was linked by the Ohio River to Pittsburgh and the principal east-west Pennsylvania transportation system of the time, the Main Line of Public Works.

Bringing new business to communities such as Conneautville, which shipped timber and hay to Pittsburgh, the Beaver and Erie Canal was heavily used in its early years but was hard to maintain. Competition from railroads and the collapse of an aqueduct over Elk Creek in Erie County led to the canal's abandonment in 1872.

Remnants
Canal sections exist near Shenango River Lake near Hermitage. Maintained for hiking, the Shenango Trail follows the old canal towpath. It runs about  along the east side of the Shenango River from Kidd's Mill Covered Bridge to the confluence of Lackawannock Creek and the river. Some canal facilities at Bridgewater, at the canal's southern end, remain; they are a part of the Bridgewater Historic District.

French Creek Feeder
Because Conneaut Lake, fed mainly by springs and small streams, did not have enough water to keep the Beaver and Erie Canal filled at its highest elevation, the state built a feeder canal. Water from the dam pool, at a higher elevation than the lake, flowed south through Meadville. It crossed French Creek by aqueduct at Shaw's Landing, where locks enabled boats to transfer between the canal and the creek. Beyond the landing, the canal turned northwest and flowed into the lake. The French Creek Feeder was completed to Meadville in 1828 and reached Conneaut Lake in 1834.

After the Beaver and Erie Canal was abandoned, the dam at Conneaut Lake was lowered. Also abandoned was the  French Creek Feeder, though for a while it still flowed through Meadville. The Crawford County Historical Society has preserved a small part of the feeder canal.

Franklin Line
 Downstream from Meadville lay the town of Franklin at the confluence of French Creek with the Allegheny River. Merchants there, concerned that the feeder canal and the main canal would divert business from Franklin, persuaded the state to build a system of locks and dams on French Creek below Shaw's Landing at Meadville. This canal, the Franklin Line, opened in 1833. Although the Franklin Line made it easier for boats to travel between Franklin and Meadville, it made it harder for rafts, which depended on river currents and were too big for the locks. Large boats also had trouble with the locks, and the creek often lacked sufficient water to carry them. In 1837, high water caused severe damage to the short-lived system, which was allowed to decline.

Pymatuning Swamp
The canal passed along a causeway of  through what later became Pymatuning State Park at Hartstown, Pennsylvania.

Points of interest

See also
 List of canals in the United States
 Nicholson House and Inn

References

External links
 American Folklife Center, Library of Congress
 USGS topographical map at Conneaut Lake from topoquest
 Pennsylvania Canal Society
 American Canal Society
 National Canal Museum

Transportation buildings and structures in Beaver County, Pennsylvania
Transportation buildings and structures in Lawrence County, Pennsylvania
Transportation buildings and structures in Mercer County, Pennsylvania
Transportation buildings and structures in Crawford County, Pennsylvania
Transportation buildings and structures in Erie County, Pennsylvania
Canals in Pennsylvania
Canals opened in 1844